The 1992 Ohio State Buckeyes football team represented the Ohio State University in the 1992 NCAA Division I-A football season. The Buckeyes compiled an 8–3–1 record, including the 1993 Florida Citrus Bowl in Orlando, Florida, where they lost, 21–14, to the Georgia Bulldogs.

Schedule

Roster

1993 NFL draftees

Awards and honors
Korey Stringer, Big Ten Freshman of the Year

References

Ohio State
Ohio State Buckeyes football seasons
Ohio State Buckeyes football